The 2003 Allianz Suisse Open Gstaad was a tennis tournament played on outdoor clay courts at the Roy Emerson Arena in Gstaad in Switzerland and was part of the International Series of the 2003 ATP Tour. The tournament ran from July 7 through July 13, 2003.

Finals

Singles

 Jiří Novák defeated  Roger Federer 5–7, 6–3, 6–3, 1–6,  6–3
 It was Novák's only title of the year and the 20th of his career.

Doubles

 Leander Paes /  David Rikl defeated  František Čermák /  Leoš Friedl 6–3, 6–3
 It was Paes' 3rd title of the year and the 27th of his career. It was Rikl's 2nd title of the year and the 28th of his career.

External links
 Official website 
 ATP tournament profile

Allianz Suisse Open Gstaad
Swiss Open (tennis)
Allianz Suisse Open Gstaad
2003 Allianz Suisse Open Gstaad